Condica viscosa is a moth of the family Noctuidae. It was described by Christian Friedrich Freyer in 1831. It is found from southern Europe and North Africa to Arabia and the southern parts of western Asia (including Asia Minor, Israel and Iran). The habitat consists of lowland areas near the coast, including dry slopes, road side verges, dry river beds or fallow land.

The wingspan is 25–29 mm.Warren (1914) states 
H. viscosa Frr. (= implexa Tr.) (47 b). Forewing dull greyish redbrown; the lines and edges of the stigmata marked indistinctly by a few pale scales; hindwing reddish brown, darker in the female. Recorded from Spain, Sicily, and the Canary Islands, and from Syria.

Adults are on wing from May to June and in October.

The larvae feed on Inula viscosa, Pluchea discoroides and Pulicaria glutinosa.

Subspecies
Condica viscosa viscosa
Condica viscosa meridiana Hacker & Saldaitis, 2010 (Yemen)
Condica viscosa persicola Wiltshire, 1952

References

 "Condica viscosa (Freyer, 1831)". Insecta.pro.

Moths described in 1831
Condicinae
Moths of Europe
Moths of Asia
Moths of the Middle East